Steirastoma acutipenne is a species of beetle in the family Cerambycidae. It was described by Sallé in 1856.

References

Acanthoderini
Beetles described in 1856